The Roman Catholic Diocese of Tianjin/Tíentsín (Latin:) is a suffragan diocese in the Ecclesiastical province of the Metropolitan Archbishop of Beijing in PR China.

Its cathedral episcopal see is Cathedral of St. Joseph (Laoxikai Church), in the city of Tianjin, which also has the former cathedral: Our Lady of Victory Church (Wanghailou Church).

Data from 1950 indicated there are 50,000 registered Roman Catholics in Tianjin, occupying 1.4% of the total 3,600,000 population. Recent data from 2008 reflected a recovery of presumably 100,000 Catholics after years of persecution of which 40,000 are officially registered and 60,000 is the estimated number of underground faithful. Even that considered, it is still only a very tiny proportion of the current 15,000,000 population (0.7%).

History 
 June 19, 1870: the Tianjin Massacre, an anti-Catholic riot, occurred in the city of Tianjin
 April 27, 1912: The Apostolic Vicariate of Coastal Chi-Li was established on territory split off from the Apostolic Vicariate of Northern Chi-Li
 December 3, 1924: Renamed after its see as Apostolic Vicariate of Tianjin
 April 11, 1946: Promoted as Diocese of Tianjin

Ordinaries 
(all Roman Rite)
 Apostolic Vicars of Coastal Chi-Li
 Paul-Marie Dumond, Lazarists (C.M.) (April 27, 1912 – July 21, 1920), Titular Bishop of Curubis (1912.05.02 – 1944.02.19), later Apostolic Administrator of Ganzhou 贛州 (China) (1920.07.21 – 1925.05.12) becoming Apostolic Vicar of Ganzhou (1925.05.12 – 1931.07.03), Apostolic Vicar of Nanchang 南昌 (China) (1931.07.03 – death 1944.02.19)

 Apostolic Vicar of Tianjin
 Jean de Vienne de Hautefeuille, C.M. (July 12, 1923 – April 11, 1946), Titular Bishop of Abrittum (1915.08.10 – 1946.04.11 see below); previously Coadjutor Apostolic Vicar of Southwestern Chi-Li 直隸西南 (China) (1915.08.10 – 1917.04.02), succeeding as Vicar Apostolic of Southwestern Chi-Li (1917.04.02 – 1919.04.02), Coadjutor Vicar Apostolic of Northern Chi-Li 直隸北境 (China) (1919.04.02 – 1923.07.12)

 Suffragan Bishops of Tianjin
 Jean de Vienne de Hautefeuille, C.M. (see above April 11, 1946 – 1951), later Titular Bishop of Abora (1951.06.14 – 1957.09.21)
 Apostolic Administrator John Zhang Bi-de (1951 – February 13, 1953), while Bishop of Zhaoxian 趙縣 (China) (1946.04.11 – 1953.02.13)
 Apostolic Administrator Fr. Alphonsus Zhao, C.M. (February 13, 1953 – 1981) 
 Uncanonical Li De-pei (李德培)  (1958 – 1991.07.13), without papal mandate
 Stefano Li Side (1982 clandestine consecration – 2019.06.08), under house arrest at Ji County for refusing to join the Patriotic Catholic Association
Melchior Shi Hongzhen (since 2019.06.08), under house arrest

Sources and external links 

 GCatholic.org, with incumbent biography links
 Catholic Hierarchy
 Diocese website (Chinese)

Roman Catholic dioceses in China
Christian organizations established in 1912
Religion in Tianjin
Roman Catholic dioceses and prelatures established in the 20th century
1912 establishments in China